The J.League World Challenge is a friendly match between J.League clubs and powerful overseas clubs invited to Japan by the J.League to take advantage of a two-week break in the J1 League during the summer season starting in 2017.

2017

Teams 
  Kashima Antlers
  Urawa Red Diamonds
  Sevilla
  Borussia Dortmund

Matches

2019

Teams 
  Kawasaki Frontale
  Chelsea

Match

See also 
 J.League (Japan Professional Football League)
 Japan Football Association (JFA)

References

External links
 J.League World Challenge 2017
 J.League World Challenge 2019

International club association football competitions hosted by Japan
Japanese football friendly trophies
Recurring sporting events established in 2017
2017 in Japanese football
July 2017 sports events in Asia
2019 in Japanese football
July 2019 sports events in Japan